Rosetown may refer to:

Places 
Rosetown, South Australia, locality in South Australia
Rosetown, Saskatchewan, town in Saskatchewan, Canada
Rosetown Airport

Electoral districts in Saskatchewan
Rosetown (electoral district), former federal electoral district (1925-1935)
Rosetown (provincial electoral district), former provincial electoral district (1912-1975)
Rosetown—Biggar (federal electoral district), a federal electoral district in Saskatchewan, Canada
Rosetown–Biggar (provincial electoral district), a provincial electoral district in Saskatchewan, Canada
Rosetown-Elrose, provincial electoral district (since 2003)
Saskatoon—Rosetown—Biggar, former federal electoral district (1997-2015)

See also 
Rose Township (disambiguation)
Rosemont (disambiguation)